The 2014 Comerica Bank Challenger was a professional tennis tournament played on hard courts. It was the 27th edition of the tournament which was part of the 2014 ATP Challenger Tour. It took place in Aptos, California, United States between 2 and 10 August July 2014.

Singles main-draw entrants

Seeds

 1 Rankings are as of July 28, 2014.

Other entrants
The following players received wildcards into the singles main draw:
  Andre Dome 
  Marcos Giron
  Kevin King
  Mackenzie McDonald

The following players received entry from the qualifying draw:
  Dennis Nevolo 
  Daniel Nguyen 
  Sanam Singh 
  Yasutaka Uchiyama

The following player entered into the singles main draw as an alternative:
  Wu Di

Champions

Singles

 Marcos Baghdatis def.  Mikhail Kukushkin 7–6(9–7), 6–4

Doubles

 Ruben Bemelmans /  Laurynas Grigelis def.  Purav Raja /  Sanam Singh 6–3, 4–6, [11–9]

References
Official Website

External links
ITF Search
ATP official site

Comerica Bank Challenger
Nordic Naturals Challenger
Com
Comerica Bank Challenger